Burunucu is a Neighborhood in Silifke district of Mersin Province, Turkey. The population of Burnucu   is 772 as of 2011.

The village was the site of a port in antiquity named Sarpedon.

References

Villages in Silifke District